Jung Wan-sook is a South Korean taekwondo practitioner. 

She won a gold medal in heavyweight at the 1989 World Taekwondo Championships in Seoul, after defeating Yvonne Franssen in the final.

References

External links

Year of birth missing (living people)
Living people
South Korean female taekwondo practitioners
World Taekwondo Championships medalists
20th-century South Korean women